This is the results breakdown of the local elections held in the Valencian Community on 27 May 2007. The following tables show detailed results in the autonomous community's most populous municipalities, sorted alphabetically.

Overall

City control
The following table lists party control in the most populous municipalities, including provincial capitals (shown in bold). Gains for a party are displayed with the cell's background shaded in that party's colour.

Municipalities

Alcoy
Population: 60,590

Alicante
Population: 322,431

Benidorm
Population: 67,627

Castellón de la Plana
Population: 172,110

Elche
Population: 219,032

Elda
Population: 55,138

Gandia
Population: 74,827

Orihuela
Population: 77,979

Paterna
Population: 57,343

Sagunto
Population: 62,702

Torrent
Population: 74,616

Torrevieja
Population: 92,034

Valencia

Population: 805,304

See also
2007 Valencian regional election

References

Valencian Community
2007